Leila Berg (12 November 1917 – 17 April 2012) was an English children's author. She was also known as a journalist and a writer on education and children's rights. Berg was a recipient of the Eleanor Farjeon Award.

Biography
Berg was brought up in Salford, Lancashire, in a Jewish doctor's family. She wrote vividly about that part of her life in Flickerbook (1997), describing also later meetings in Cambridge through her older brother, particularly with Margot Heinemann and J. B. S. Haldane, whom she would reference obliquely in the early Chunky books. She associated with Britain's Young Communist League members at the time of the Spanish Civil War, in which she lost two lovers, and eventually joined the movement. Her first journalist's job was with the British communist daily the Daily Worker.

Berg was influenced in her thinking by the psychologist Susan Isaacs. After working as a journalist in World War II, during which she married and started a family, she began to write children's fiction. She also took an interest in the progressive education advocated by A. S. Neill at Summerhill, Michael Duane of (Risinghill) and John Holt, who advocated "unschooling".

Grittier style
Berg began writing in a more realistic and gritty style, for younger children, in the 1960s, in the Nippers series of readers. This was an influential move designed to bring children's books closer to ordinary urban life and away from the Janet and John reader style, and probably the cosiness of Enid Blyton's realm, a widespread influence in that period.

She became the children's editor with the publisher Methuen. As she put it in a speech at the University of Essex, at an honorary degree ceremony: "All my life I have sought to empower children."

Award, death
She was awarded the Eleanor Farjeon Award in 1974.

Leila Berg died on 17 April 2012.

Works

References

External links

Biography
Risinghill School website

1917 births
2012 deaths
British children's writers
British women children's writers
British Communist writers
British Jews
People from Salford